Edward Hore (born 17 November 1849, date of death unknown) was a British sailor] who competed in the 1900 Summer Olympics in Meulan, France. Hore took the gold in the second race of the 3 to 10 ton and a Bronze in the 10 to 20 ton.

References

External links

 

1849 births
Year of death missing
British male sailors (sport)
Olympic sailors of Great Britain
Sailors at the 1900 Summer Olympics – 3 to 10 ton
Medalists at the 1900 Summer Olympics
Olympic gold medallists for Great Britain
Olympic bronze medallists for Great Britain
Olympic medalists in sailing
Sailors at the 1900 Summer Olympics – 10 to 20 ton
Place of death missing